Raymond Otis Whitley (December 5, 1901 – February 21, 1979) was a country and western singer and actor.

Career

Singing and live performance
Whitley was born in Atlanta, Georgia, United States. He began his singing career in New York City in 1930. He had traveled to New York where he became a construction worker on the Empire State Building and the George Washington Bridge. While working as a steelworker, he heard of an audition at a local radio station.  He was hired as a pop singer and learned a few chords on a guitar to back himself.  Soon he was backed by professional musicians, including the Frank Luther Trio.   He formed "The Range Ramblers" and began to broadcast on WMCA. He then traveled with the World's Championship Rodeo organization, under the ownership of Colonel Johnson, renaming his band "Ray Whitley and The Six Bar Cowboys." Whitley was skilled in the use of the stockwhip and could remove a cigarette from a man's lips with a single stroke, using either hand.

Whitley recorded for several record labels, including Okeh, Apollo Records and Decca.

Development of the Gibson SJ-200
In 1937, Whitley had worked with Gibson on the production of the Gibson SJ-200 acoustic guitar, which was initially known as the "Super Jumbo". Whitley used his own time and money to design a guitar, which he took to Gibson. He explained the features and merits of the instrument, suggesting that by presenting them to other stars of the day, would result in really putting the Gibson name on the musical instrument map. As a result, Whitley was the first performer to own a Gibson SJ-200. The first SJ-200, custom built by Gibson for Whitley, is on display in the Country Music Hall of Fame Museum.  The SJ-200 has since become an American icon, and has been played by hundreds of different guitarists over the years.

Motion pictures
In 1937, Ray Whitley was signed by RKO Radio Pictures as a specialty performer in the studio's "B" westerns starring George O'Brien, and O'Brien's successor Tim Holt. RKO also gave Whitley a starring series of his own: 18 two-reel musical short subjects, produced between 1937 and 1942.

In the late 1950s, Whitley made appearances on the Roy Rogers TV specials, he also appeared in the feature film Giant starring Elizabeth Taylor, Rock Hudson, and James Dean.

Whitley wrote the original western tune Back in the Saddle Again. The song was first performed by the author, Ray Whitley, in the western movie Border G-Man, in which he played the part of "Luke Jones.” Gene Autry heard it and bought the song for a reported $200, making it his theme song.  Whitley and Autry changed the order of the verse and chorus, and made a very slight change in the melody, resulting in the present popular version. It is one of the most recognized and recorded Western music tunes in history.

Death and legacy
Ray Whitley died on February 21, 1979, while en route to a fishing trip to Mexico with his son-in-law, Hal Bracken.

Ray Whitley's original Gibson SJ-200 is on display at the Country Music Hall of Fame in Nashville Tennessee. He was inducted into the Nashville Songwriters Hall of Fame in 1981 and, in 1996, Whitley was inducted into the Western Music Association Hall of Fame.

Instruments
Ray Whitley also endorsed another Gibson made guitar, sold by the mail order house Montgomery Ward, under the house brand "Recording King." This highly esteemed guitar was marketed only in 1939, and featured the signature of Mr. Whitley on the headstock. 235 of these were made in mahogany, and 235 in rosewood. One of these instruments was the preferred guitar of American composer John Fahey, who recorded extensively on the instrument from 1969 until the mid-1970s. Fahey destroyed the guitar during a fight with his girl friend and replaced it with a Martin D-76.

Gibson Shipping Ledgers show the following totals for the Montgomery Ward – Recording King Ray Whitley Jumbo Models:

Total of 147 – RK Ray Whitley Model No. 1027 (Rosewood back & sides, "bat wing" shaped bridge)
Total of 170 – RK Ray Whitley Model No. 1028 (Mahogany back & sides, plain rectangle-style bridge)

Breaks down like this:
143 No. 1027s shipped in 1939
Only 4 No. 1027s shipped in 1940

115 No. 1028s were shipped in 1939
55 No. 1028s shipped in 1940

First shipment of 1027s – January 23, 1939 – Last: February 27, 1940,
First shipment of 1028s – June 23, 1939 – Last: June 13, 1940

Filmography

Feature films, featuring Ray Whitley

Short subjects, starring Ray Whitley and His Six Bar Cowboys
All produced and released by RKO Radio Pictures

References

Bibliography
The Guinness Who's Who Of Country Music. Guinness Publishing, 1993.

External links

1901 births
1979 deaths
American male singer-songwriters
American country singer-songwriters
Vee-Jay Records artists
20th-century American male actors
20th-century American singers
Male Western (genre) film actors
20th-century American male singers